Caner Pekşen (born June 9, 1987 in Turkey) is a Turkish volleyball player. He competed at the 2015 European Games He is 190 cm and plays as setter. He plays for Develi Belediyespor

References

1987 births
Living people
Turkish men's volleyball players
Galatasaray S.K. (men's volleyball) players
Volleyball players at the 2015 European Games
European Games competitors for Turkey
21st-century Turkish people